Taoyuan Aerotropolis is a large urban planning development at the Taiwan Taoyuan International Airport in Taoyuan City, Taiwan.

The 4,500 hectare development, centered around the existing airport, will include a districts for transportation, logistics, industry, and residential development, and has been called "one of Taiwan’s largest national infrastructure projects ever." The Aerotropolis is expected to create 200,000-300,000 new jobs, generate annual revenues of NT$2.3 trillion (US$75.4 billion), and accommodate 4.5 million tons of container cargo a year.

The development may require the acquisition of up to 3,200 hectares of land and the relocation of over 40,000 people

Future Developments
A third runway and terminal will be added to Taiwan Taoyuan International Airport, boosting the capacity of the airport from 40 million to over 60 million passengers by 2025. Previously approved during the administration of Ma Ying-jeou, the Aerotropolis project proved to be controversial, "due to allegations of forced relocations, the prospect of added pollution, and insinuations of irregularities in land acquisition."

The Taoyuan City Mayor Cheng Wen-tsan, serving since 2014, has promised that the current, revamped version of the project will be developed according to five principles:
 Public Transparency
 Democratic Participation
 Eco Development
 Public Interest
 Introduction of Industries

It will also strive to deliver low energy consumption, low pollution, and low water usage, along with high added value—guidelines that the mayor has dubbed "three lows and one high"—which will help resolve problems left from the Ma administration's approach to development.

Taoyuan Aerotropolis Project plans to construct a large-scale industry zone, free-trade zone, commercial zone, and residence zone. The total development area for the first phase is approximately 2,600 hectares, among which 422 hectares are for the industry zone and 120 hectares for the free-trade zone. In 2020, part of the land for the aerotropolis will be acquired and the project will initiate the development phase. The Taoyuan Aerotropolis Project will be an important case of Taiwan’s major construction. In addition, National Tsing Hua University, National Yang Ming Chiao Tung University, and National Taiwan Ocean University are all optimistic about Taoyuan’s development outlook and chose to collaborate with Taoyuan and established biomedical research and development centres or incubators. The city government will accelerate the development speed of business investment and industry zones, realize the concept of airport economics, and share the benefits brought by the airport with citizens.

References

External links 
 Taoyuan Aerotropolis website
 Origin of the Project - Taoyuan Aerotropolis
 President touts Taoyuan Aerotropolis as key to Taiwan's future
 Officials vow to complete the Taoyuan Aerotropolis
 Aerotropolis 'means too many evictions' Archived 2016-11-21 at the Wayback Machine, The China Post, Taiwan
 Man commits suicide after land grab
 Taiwan: residents resist forced eviction for 'Aerotropolis' megaproject
 Taoyuan launches Aerotropolis investigation
 "Asian Silicon Valley" in Taoyuan misses key points
 Can Taiwan Build An 'Asian Silicon Valley'?
 Taoyuan property heats up on aerotropolis, upgrade
 What will it take for the 'Asian Silicon Valley' to take root in Taiwan?
 'Asian Silicon Valley' project will change Taiwan's future: premier
 Asian Silicon Valley = Taiwan’s DPP Collision with Student Movement
 Mayor orders probe into aerotropolis
 Premier promises to reduce land grabs
 Rain wreaks havoc at Taoyuan airport
 Flash flooding hits Taoyuan Airport
 Taoyuan airport’s Terminal Two hit by flooding again
 Taoyuan Aerotropolis case presented at East Asia Tribunal on Evictions
 Taoyuan Aerotropolis expropriations should be halted ahead of review, advocates say
 Protest threatened over Aerotropolis

Geography of Taoyuan City
Economy of Taoyuan City
Planned developments
2010 in Taiwan
Planned cities in Taiwan
Proposed infrastructure in Taiwan